The Kansas Department of Labor is a state agency in Kansas that assists in the prevention of economic insecurity through unemployment insurance and workers compensation, by providing a fair and efficient venue to exercise employer and employee rights, and by helping employers promote a safe work environment for their employees.

The agency was founded in 1939, and it is currently headed by Secretary of Labor Amber Shultz.

References

External links

Kansas Department of Labor publications online at the KGI Online Library

Labor
State departments of labor of the United States
Government agencies established in 1939
1939 establishments in Kansas